Timber Hawkeye (born Tomer Gal, July 19, 1977), is an Israeli-born citizen and resident of the United States, best known as the author of Buddhist Boot Camp (HarperCollins Publishers, 2013), and of his memoir: Faithfully Religionless (Hawkeye Publishers, 2016).

Early life 
Hawkeye was born Tomer Gal in Bat Yam, and raised in Katzrin, a small town in the Golan Heights of Israel, until he moved with his parents and older sister to San Francisco at the age of 13. He was introduced to books by Eknath Easwaran at 16, and that's what sparked his interest in mindfulness and meditation.

Hawkeye describes his teenage years and early twenties as an ongoing attempt to embody what the media portrayed as the definition of being "American" and "Successful." He started out as a paperboy at 14 delivering the San Francisco Examiner in the Sunset District, got his start in Corporate America during his senior year of high school when he worked for State Compensation Insurance Fund, and many office jobs after that (from the California State University, Stanislaus Foundation Department his first year of college, to paralegal jobs at law firms around the Bay Area and later in Seattle, Washington, focusing mainly on commercial real estate.

Transformation 
In his books, interviews and public talks, Hawkeye mentions a couple of key moments that changed the trajectory of his life:

 When he moved from San Francisco, CA to Seattle, WA, he accepted a job at a law firm that offered him 50% of the annual salary he received in California, but he loved Seattle so much and found himself twice as happy in the Pacific Northwest as he had been in Northern California. At that moment he realized that how happy he is has nothing to do with how much money he makes (despite the media constantly telling us otherwise). 
 After five years of working at the same law firm in Seattle, another paralegal at the firm was celebrating her 30-year anniversary, and Hawkeye says the fact that she was celebrating 30 years in a cubicle terrified him, as it had already been a total of ten years for him in California and Washington. That's when he decided there's got to be more to life than just working for a paycheck. He sold everything he ever owned and moved to Honolulu, Hawaii with the intention to lead a simple and uncomplicated life.

He worked odd jobs on the island just to cover minimal expenses, and spent the rest of his time playing beach volleyball and tennis, hiking, and independently studying world religions and psychology simultaneously to better understand what people believe and why they believe what they do.

Books 
Timber Hawkeye is the bestselling author of three books: Buddhist Boot Camp (2013), Faithfully Religionless (2016), and The Opposite of Namaste (2022).

Hawkeye's first book Buddhist Boot Camp is a collection of emails he had sent to his friends from Hawaii over the course of approximately eight years, which is why each chapter in the book is only a page or two long and can be read in any order.

Buddhist Boot Camp was initially self-published through LuLu, but their distribution channels do not meet the specific requirements that independent bookstores and Barnes & Noble, for example, have for ordering books. He re-published it through Lightning Source, but within a month HarperCollins contacted him to republish the book for a third time, now in hardcover with twice as many chapters, multiple languages, and worldwide distribution.

Buddhist Boot Camp went on to become an international bestseller, as well as part of the required-reading curriculum at a few high schools in California, and a guide used by therapists, veteran support group leaders, and correctional facilities across the globe that offer inmates free yoga and meditation classes as well.

After touring with Buddhist Boot Camp across the U.S., U.K. and Australia, Hawkeye moved into a little cabin in the East Sierras to write and publish his second book (a memoir called Faithfully Religionless).  Hawkeye Publishers, which was set up by Hawkeye in early 2016, was established to assist other authors through the publication process, as the world of independent publishing continues to evolve. His intention is to allow authors to focus on their writing instead of the often-overwhelming process of publishing, distribution, and marketing.

Faithfully Religionless targets audiences who consider themselves spiritual, but not religious. It aims at aiding readers to lead a simple and uncomplicated life with happiness at their fingertips. It helps one discover the difference between feelings and emotions, the disparity between truths and facts, and the countless benefits of mindfully living a simple and uncomplicated life. Faithfully Religionless is a memoir by Timber Hawkeye. 

The Opposite of Namaste was published on August 8, 2022. It contains 84 transcripts of Buddhist Boot Camp Podcast episodes. If "Namaste" means "The divine in me acknowledges the divine in you," then "The Opposite of Namaste" means "The ego in me sees the ego in you." The intention is to reduce judgment of one another through understanding what we are tempted to criticize.

Reception 
Buddhist Boot Camp became a Bestseller within a year of publication in English and the German edition entitled Sit Happens. 

Faithfully Religionless became a Bestseller during the first month of publication.

The Opposite of Namaste was an immediate Bestseller the day of publication.

Faithfully Religionless was launched at Grace Cathedral in San Francisco, and many churches not only embrace Hawkeye's message as perfectly in line with their own invitation to establish a personal relationship with God, not against it, but have hosted Hawkeye on his book tour across the U.S. (including Saint Augustine's Episcopal Church in New Orleans, the Center for Spiritual Living in Camarillo and Napa Valley, Unity Church in Kansas City, and the Unitarian Universalist Church in Ventura).

References

External links 
 
 Faithfully Religionless at TEDxHonolulu
 Author Page on Amazon

Living people
American writers
Israeli emigrants to the United States
1977 births